Portageville is a city in New Madrid and Pemiscot counties in the U.S. state of Missouri. The population was 2,942 according to the 2020 Census.

History
A post office called Portageville has been in operation since 1873. The community takes its name from nearby Portage Bayou.

From 1935 to 1936, Portageville was the home of the Portageville Pirates, part of the Kitty League. "In 1935, the Portageville Pirates are awarded the second-half title after the Jackson Generals and Union City Greyhounds are disqualified for having too many class players on their rosters." In 1936, the Pirates relocated to Owensboro, Kentucky.

Geography
Portageville is located at  (36.429828, -89.701157), primarily in New Madrid County. It lies along U.S. Route 61 and Missouri Route 162, which converge briefly as they pass through the city. Interstate 55 passes through the eastern part of the city.

Climate
The climate in this area is characterized by hot, humid summers and generally mild to cool winters.  According to the Köppen Climate Classification system, Portageville has a humid subtropical climate, abbreviated "Cfa" on climate maps.

Demographics

2010 census
As of the census of 2010, there were 3,228 people, 1,346 households, and 894 families living in the city. The racial makeup of the city was 78.62% White, 18.96% Black or African American, 0.06% Native American, 0.19% Asian, 0.19% from other races, and 1.98% from two or more races. Hispanic or Latino of any race were 0.87% of the population.

There were 1,346 households, of which 34.0% had children under the age of 18 living with them, 43.6% were married couples living together, 17.5% had a female householder with no husband present, 5.3% had a male householder with no wife present, and 33.6% were non-families. 29.8% of all households were made up of individuals, and 14.2% had someone living alone who was 65 years of age or older. The average household size was 2.37 and the average family size was 2.92.

The median age in the city was 38.6 years. 25.7% of residents were under the age of 18; 7.9% were between the ages of 18 and 24; 24% were from 25 to 44; 26% were from 45 to 64; and 16.4% were 65 years of age or older. The gender makeup of the city was 46.4% male and 53.6% female.

2000 census
As of the census of 2000, there were 3,295 people, 1,335 households, and 890 families living in the city. The population density was 1,643.5 people per square mile (636.1/km). There were 1,404 housing units at an average density of 700.3 per square mile (271.0/km). The racial makeup of the city was 82.00% White, 16.36% African American, 0.18% Native American, 0.30% Asian, 0.27% from other races, and 0.88% from two or more races. Hispanic or Latino of any race were 0.82% of the population.

There were 1,335 households, out of which 33.3% had children under the age of 18 living with them, 46.4% were married couples living together, 17.3% had a female householder with no husband present, and 33.3% were non-families. 29.6% of all households were made up of individuals, and 15.1% had someone living alone who was 65 years of age or older. The average household size was 2.43 and the average family size was 3.02.

In the city, the population was spread out, with 27.3% under the age of 18, 9.3% from 18 to 24, 26.4% from 25 to 44, 20.9% from 45 to 64, and 16.2% who were 65 years of age or older. The median age was 37 years. For every 100 females there were 84.6 males. For every 100 females age 18 and over, there were 77.4 males.

The median income for a household in the city was $26,729, and the median income for a family was $35,913. Males had a median income of $31,325 versus $20,735 for females. The per capita income for the city was $15,114. About 21.4% of families and 27.0% of the population were below the poverty line, including 37.8% of those under age 18 and 25.1% of those age 65 or over.

Education
Portageville School District operates one elementary school, one middle school and Portageville High School.

Portageville has a lending library, a branch of the New Madrid County Library.

Notable people
Luis Morgan Casey, Roman Catholic bishop, was born in Portageville.
Vermel Whalen, Ohio state legislator, was born in Portageville.

See also
 List of Portageville mayors

References

External links

 Official website
 Historic maps of Portageville in the Sanborn Maps of Missouri Collection at the University of Missouri

Cities in New Madrid County, Missouri
Cities in Pemiscot County, Missouri
Cities in Missouri